The following is a list of notable Old Marlburians, former pupils of Marlborough College, Wiltshire, England.

Academia and education
Andrew Boggis, Master in College at Eton and chairman of the Headmasters' and Headmistresses' Conference, 2006
 Charles Fisher, Headmaster, Geelong Church of England Grammar School, Australia
Peter Lamarque, philosopher
John Raven, classical scholar and botanist
Henry Wace, Principal of King's College London (1883–1897), former Dean of Canterbury

Arts

 Anthony Blunt, art historian and communist spy
 Wilfrid Jasper Walter Blunt, writer and art teacher
 Lauren Child, writer and illustrator
 Claude Ferrier, architect
 Susannah Fiennes, artist
 Keith Henderson, artist
 William Morris, artist and writer
 Pontine Paus, designer, shipping heiress and socialite
 Charles Saumarez Smith, art historian, former Director of the National Gallery
 Graham Shepard, cartoonist and illustrator
 Ellis Waterhouse, art historian

Literature

 E. F. Benson, novelist
 John Betjeman, poet
 Humphrey Carpenter, biographer and broadcaster
 Bruce Chatwin, novelist and travel writer
 Cressida Cowell, ex-Children Laureate and creator of How to Train Your Dragon.
 J. Meade Falkner, author of Moonfleet and armaments manufacturer
 Anthony Hope, writer
 Arthur Lewis Jenkins, poet 
 Dick King-Smith, writer
 Louis MacNeice, poet
 John Beverley Nichols, writer
 David Nobbs, comedy writer (Reginald Perrin)
 Redmond O'Hanlon, travel writer
 Ben Pimlott, biographer
John Preston, journalist and novelist
 James Runcie, novelist and television producer
 Siegfried Sassoon, poet
 Charles Sorley, poet
 Bernard Spencer, poet
 Adam Thorpe, poet, novelist and playwright 
 R. J. Yeatman, co-author of 1066 and All That

Music
 Toby Smith, keyboardist of Jamiroquai
 Bo Bruce, singer-songwriter
 Chris de Burgh, singer-songwriter
 Nick Drake, singer-songwriter
 Anthony Inglis, conductor
 Crispian Steele-Perkins, classical trumpeter
 David Mahoney, conductor, producer and creative director
 Fred Again, producer and composer

Theatre, cinema and television
 Robert Addie, actor
 Stephen Barry, director and administrator
 John Wingett Davies, film exhibitor
 Guy du Maurier, dramatist and soldier
Michael Elwyn, actor
Charles Furneaux, producer
Colin Gordon, actor
 Wilfrid Hyde-White, actor
 Harry Brodribb Irving, actor
 Laurence Sydney Brodribb Irving, actor and dramatist
 Damian Jones, producer
 James Robertson Justice, actor
 James Mason, actor
 Simon McBurney, actor, writer and director
 Michael Pennington, actor and director
 Clive Robertson, actor
 Antony Root, television executive and producer
 William Desmond Taylor, director
 Ernest Thesiger, actor
 Nicholas Woodeson, actor
Jack Whitehall, comedian, television writer/producer and actor
 Angus Wright, actor
Emerald Fennell, actress, director and screenwriter
Robert Watts, Hollywood film producer

Politics
 Harriett Baldwin, MP for West Worcestershire
 Sally Bercow, wife of Speaker John Bercow
 Tim Boswell, MP for Daventry
 Stephen Bradley, former British Consul-General to Hong Kong
 Henry Brooke, Baron Brooke of Cumnor, Home Secretary
 Lord Brooke of Sutton Mandeville, Cabinet minister
 Rab Butler, statesman
 Samantha Cameron, wife of former Prime Minister David Cameron
 Christopher Chope, MP for Christchurch
 Otis Ferry, hunt supporter and political activist, son of singer Bryan Ferry
 Alastair Goodlad, former MP for Eddisbury and High Commissioner to Australia
 Daniel Hannan, MEP for the South East of England
 Leonard Trelawny Hobhouse, British liberal politician and sociologist; one of the 'Fathers of Liberalism'
 William Jowitt, Lord Chancellor
 Peter Kirk, politician, first leader of the British delegation to the European Parliament
 George Butler Lloyd, MP for Shrewsbury 1913–1922
 Mark Malloch Brown, Minister of State at the Foreign and Commonwealth Office
 John Maples, MP for Stratford-upon-Avon
 Frances Osborne, ex-wife of Chancellor of the Exchequer George Osborne
 William Newton Dunn, Conservative, and later Liberal Democrat, MEP for the East Midlands.
 John Parker, MP for Romford
 Maurice Petherick, MP for Penryn & Falmouth
 Mark Reckless, MP for Rochester and Strood
 Malcolm Ian Sinclair, 20th Earl of Caithness, politician
 Hallam Tennyson, Lord Tennyson, statesman
 Dennis Forwood Vosper, MP for Runcorn
 Lord Wright of Richmond, diplomat; Permanent Under-Secretary of State, Foreign and Commonwealth Office
 Montague Yeats-Brown, diplomat; consul to Genoa and Boston

Sciences and engineering
 J. Richard Batchelor, transplant immunologist
 C. V. Boys, experimental physicist
 Francis Camps, pathologist
 George Stuart Carter, zoologist
 Henry Hugh Clutton, surgeon
 Sir Charles Galton Darwin, physicist
 John Dolphin CBE, inventor and engineer
 Sir Nigel Gresley, steam locomotive engineer
 Donald Lynden-Bell, astronomer
 Sir Peter Medawar, Nobel prize-winning biologist
 David Morley, child health pioneer
 Alex Moulton, engineer and inventor of the Moulton Bicycle
 Peter Dunn, paediatrician who improved the care of newborn babies
 Sir Hugh Pelham, cell biologist
 Philip Sheppard, geneticist and lepidopterist
 Percy Sladen, marine zoologist
 Edward Thompson, steam locomotive engineer
Thomas Valintine, doctor and New Zealand public health administrator
 Bernard Waddy, epidemiologist
 E. F. Warburg, botanist
 John Zachary Young, physiologist

Sport

 George Ainsworth, first-class cricketer
 Robert Barker, played for England in the first international football match
 Fred Beart, cricketer
 Henry Bell, cricketer
 Sir Hugh Bomford, cricketer
 Walter Brooks, cricketer
 Francis Chichester, round the world yachtsman
 William Crawley, cricketer
 Charles Dewé, cricketer
 Arthur Duthie, cricketer
 John Dolphin, cricketer
 Jason Dunford, swimmer
 Eric Elstob, cricketer
 Edward Fellowes, cricketer
 Arthur Fortescue, cricketer
 John Fuller, cricketer
 Edward Garnier, cricketer
 Arthur Sumner Gibson, English rugby union player in the first international match in 1871
 Jamie Gibson, rugby union player
 John Gunner, cricketer
 Alfred St. George Hamersley, English rugby union player in the first international match, later team captain
 Sir John Hoskyns, 15th Baronet, cricketer
 Edward Hume, cricketer
 John Hunt, leader of the first successful ascent of Mount Everest
 Hector Jelf, first-class cricketer
 Nigel Jerram, first-class cricketer
 Edward Kewley, nineteenth century England Rugby captain
 Sir Henry King, first-class cricketer
 Robert Kingsford, England international footballer and FA Cup winner
 John Lloyd, Welsh cricketer
 Reginald Lord, cricketer
 John Maples, cricketer
 Iain MacDonald-Smith, Olympic sailor, Gold medal Mexico 1968)
 Henry Maturin, Irish first-class cricketer
 Jake Meyer, mountaineer
 Michael Morgan, first-class cricketer
 John Morley, first-class cricketer
 Charles Morris, first-class cricketer
 Sydney Morse rugby union international who represented England from 1873 to 1875
 Peter Nelson, first-class cricketer and British Army officer
 Richard Page, first-class cricketer and British Army officer
 Inglewood Parkin, cricketer
 Charles Patteson, cricketer
 Edward Phillips, first-class cricketer
 Gerald Phillips, cricketer
 Mark Phillips, Olympic horseman and former husband of The Princess Royal
 Albert Porter, cricketer
 William Pulman, cricketer
 Nicholas Ross, cricketer
 John Scobell, cricketer
 Arthur Scott, cricketer
 Edward Shaw, cricketer
 Reggie Spooner, cricketer
 Allan Steel, cricketer
 Walter Thorburn, Scottish cricketer
 Mark Tomlinson, England International polo player
 Stirling Voules, cricketer
 Bernard Waddy, cricketer
 Charles Waller, cricketer
 Lancelot Ward, cricketer
 Ronald Watson, Scottish cricketer
 Charles Plumpton Wilson, England footballer
 Martin Winbolt-Lewis, Olympic athlete
 Andrew Wolfson, cricketer
 Sir John Wood , cricketer
 William Wright, cricketer

Religion
 Cyril Alington, headmaster, and Dean of Durham
 Henry Bather, Archdeacon of Ludlow 1892–1904
 Henry Bell, Canon of Carlisle
 Roy Henry Bowyer-Yin Canon and Chaplain of S Thomas College Mt Lavinia
 Alfred Blunt, Bishop of Bradford 1931–1955
 Frederick Nicholas Charrington, social reformer and founder of the Tower Hamlets Mission
 Frederick Copleston, priest and philosopher
 Nigel Cornwall, Bishop of Borneo 1949–1962
 Geoffrey Fisher, Archbishop of Canterbury
 Colin Fletcher, Bishop of Dorchester
 James Newcome, Bishop of Carlisle
 Edward Patey, Dean of Liverpool
 John Robinson, Bishop of Woolwich
 Mark Santer, Bishop of Birmingham 1987-2002
 Hugh Richard Lawrie Sheppard, known as Dick Sheppard, vicar of St. Martin-in-the-Fields and founder of the Peace Pledge Union
 Arthur Winnington-Ingram, Bishop of London
 Edward Sydney Woods, Bishop of Lichfield 1937–1953
 John Oliver Feetham, Bishop of North Queensland; recognized as a saint in the Anglican Church of Australia

Journalism

 Rawdon Christie, English-born New Zealand television presenter
 Simon Fanshawe, writer and broadcaster
 Frank Gardner, BBC News Security Correspondent
 Richard Jebb, journalist
 Derrick Somerset Macnutt, crossword compiler under the pseudonym Ximenes
 Christopher Martin-Jenkins, BBC cricket correspondent
 James Mates, ITN newscaster
 Norris and Ross McWhirter, journalists, authors, and political activists
 Tom Newton Dunn, political editor of the Sun
 Edmund Penning-Rowsell, wine writer
 Julian Pettifer, ITV and BBC journalist
 Hugh Pym, ITN and BBC News journalist
 Emily Sheffield, Evening Standard Editor, newspaper and magazine journalist    
 Sir Mark Tully, BBC India correspondent and author
 T.C. Worsley, writer, editor and television critic

Armed forces

 Nigel Anderson, soldier and local politician
 Lionel Ashfield, World War I flying ace KIA
 Phillip Scott Burge, World War I flying ace KIA
 Edward Bradford, soldier and Metropolitan Police Commissioner
 John Brigstocke, admiral, second sea lord, c-in-c Naval Home Command
 Michael Clapp senior Royal Navy officer who commanded the United Kingdom's amphibious assault group, Task Group 317.0, in the Falklands War
 Richard Corfield, officer in charge of the Somaliland Camel Constabulary
 Charles Elworthy, Chief of the Defence Staff and Governor of Windsor Castle
 Peter Gillett, Major-General, Deputy Constable and Lieutenant-Governor of Windsor Castle
 John 'Hoppy' Hopgood', pilot in 617 Squadron, killed on the Dambusters raid on 16 May 1943.
 David Maltby, pilot in 617 Squadron who flew in the Dambusters raid
 John Kiszely, Lieutenant General and Director of the Defence Academy
 Ian Macfadyen, RAF officer and Lieutenant Governor of the Isle of Man 2000–2005
 Charles MacGregor, General and head of intelligence for the British Indian Army
 Nevil Macready, General and Metropolitan Police Commissioner
 Patrick Palmer, Commander in Chief, Allied Forces Northern Europe and Governor of Windsor Castle
 John Wilfred Stanier, Field Marshal
 Hugh Stockwell, General, Deputy Supreme Allied Commander Europe from 1960 to 1964
 Henry Hughes Wilson, Field Marshal
Alex Younger, Chief of the Secret Intelligence Service

Victoria Cross and George Cross holders

VC
 Edward Kinder Bradbury VC
 Frederic Brooks Dugdale VC
 Charles Calveley Foss VC
 Reginald Clare Hart VC
 Raymond Harvey Lodge Joseph De Montmorency VC
 Llewelyn Alberic Emilius Price-Davies VC
 Lionel Ernest Queripel VC
 John Neil Randle VC
 Nowell Salmon VC
 Edward Talbot Thackeray VC
 Eric Charles Twelves Wilson VC
 Sir Henry Evelyn Wood VC
 Sidney Clayton Woodroffe VC

GC
 Arthur Frederick Crane Nicholls GC

Commerce and industry
 Michael Clapham, industrialist (ICI)
 Ernest Debenham, department store owner
 Ambrose Heal, retailer
 Ian and Kevin Maxwell, former publishers and entrepreneurs
 Robert Noel, businessman, chief executive of Land Securities Group plc
 Rob Perrins, Managing Director of Berkeley Group Holdings 
 George Duncan Rowe, stockbroker, co-founder of Rowe & Pitman
 Sir Michael Turner, General Manager (Chairman) of HSBC 1953–1962
 Piers Wedgwood, 4th Baron Wedgwood, army officer and international ambassador for the Wedgwood Group
 Simon Woodroffe, founder of the Yo Sushi restaurant chain

The Royal Family and the Court
 Princess Eugenie of York, younger daughter of The Duke of York
 Catherine, Princess of Wales (née Catherine Middleton), wife of William, Prince of Wales
 Pippa Middleton, sister and Maid of Honour to the Princess of Wales
 Robin Janvrin, courtier, Private Secretary to Queen Elizabeth II
 Alan 'Tommy' Lascelles, courtier, Private Secretary to George VI and Elizabeth II, and cousin to the husband of Mary, Princess Royal
 Nigel Bridge, Baron Bridge of Harwich, Law Lord
 John Brightman, Baron Brightman, Law Lord
 Thomas William Cain, First Deemster of the Isle of Man
 Rayner Goddard, Lord Chief Justice
 Sir Philip Margetson, Assistant Commissioner of Police of the Metropolis
 William Moore, Lord Chief Justice of Northern Ireland
 T. C. Kingsmill Moore, Irish judge, politician and author
 Sir Walter George Salis Schwabe, Chief Justice of the Madras High Court
 Sir Richard Gaskell, President of the Law Society of England and Wales

Fashion
 Amanda Harlech, model and 'muse' to John Galliano
 Stella Tennant, model and fashion designer
 Samantha Cameron, wife of former Prime Minister David Cameron and creative director at Smythson

Miscellaneous

 Sir Basil Blackett, civil servant and international finance expert
 Sir Hugh Bomford, civil servant in the Indian Civil Service
 Frederic Bonney, anthropologist and photographer
 Sir Grahame Clark, archaeologist
 O. G. S. Crawford, archaeologist
 Henry Everard, railway executive and acting President of Rhodesia
 Ian Fraser, Baron Fraser of Lonsdale, promoter of the interests of blind people
 Wilfred Grenfell, medical missionary and social reformer
 Gordon Hamilton-Fairley, oncologist and IRA victim
 Sir Edmund Ronald Leach, anthropologist
 Derrick Somerset Macnutt, Ximenes, cryptic crossword compiler for The Observer
 Ghislaine Maxwell, socialite and convicted child sex trafficker
 Tunku 'Abidin Muhriz, Founding President of Institute of Democracy and Economic Affairs (IDEAS), Malaysia
 Tracy Philipps, colonial administrator, intelligence officer, and conservationist, Secretary-General of International Union for the Conservation of Nature and Natural Resources
 Edward John Hugh Tollemache, private firm banker
 David Treffry, colonial servant, international financier and High Sheriff of Cornwall
 Prince Waranonthawat, Thai prince, grandson of King Chulalongkorn
 Gordon Welchman, code-breaker
 John Wood, civil servant in the Indian Civil Service

References

Bibliography
 A History of Marlborough College During Fifty Years from its Foundation to the Present Time by A.G. Bradley, A.C. Champneys and J.W. Baines (Macmillan & Co., 1893)
 Marlborough College Register from 1843 to 1904 Inclusive by Marlborough College (Oxford: Horace Hart, 1905).
Paths of Progress: a history of Marlborough College by Thomas Hinde (John Catt, 1992) 
Marlborough College – official site

 
Lists of people by English school affiliation
Wiltshire-related lists